Abdelilah Abdul-Wahid , (born 1 July 1956) is a former Iraq national player. He also competed in the men's tournament at the 1980 Summer Olympics.

References

1956 births
Living people
Iraqi footballers
Olympic footballers of Iraq
Footballers at the 1980 Summer Olympics
Association football midfielders